Karrueche Tran (born May 17, 1988) is an American actress and model. From 2013 to 2016, she starred as Vivian Johnson in the web series The Bay. For producing the series, she won two Daytime Emmy Awards. Her return to The Bay for its sixth season garnered her the Daytime Emmy for Outstanding Performance by a Lead Actress in a Daytime Fiction Program at the 2021 Daytime Emmy Awards. Her win made her the first person of Asian Pacific American descent to win an Emmy for Lead Actress or Actor. Tran also starred as Virginia Loc on the TNT series Claws.

Early life 
Tran is a native of Los Angeles, California. She was raised by her Vietnamese mother and Jamaican godmother. Her father is African-American. Tran identifies as Blasian, and has a younger maternal half-brother.

Tran first attended high school at Fairfax High School before switching schools, and graduating from Birmingham High School in 2006.

Career

Early career and The Bay: 2009–2014 
Tran began her career in the fashion industry as a personal shopper. From 2009 to 2012, she worked at Nordstrom located at the Westfield Topanga mall in Canoga Park, California. Later, Tran worked as a freelance celebrity stylist in Hollywood. She first gained public attention when she began dating R&B singer Chris Brown in 2011.

Around that time, Tran began modeling for local brands. She was the face of Lady Crooks, the women's division under the streetwear brand Crooks and Castles for their Summer 2013 collection. She also began working on her own clothing line, The Kill.  Tran gained wider prominence after starring as Vivian Johnson on the Emmy award-winning web series The Bay from 2013 to 2016. For producing the series, she won three Daytime Emmy Awards.

In 2014, Tran appeared in volume one of the photography book, Love West Coast Girls, by celebrity photographer Mike Miller. That same year, she hosted the BET Awards red carpet and multiple events during the official BET Weekend. She had previously co-hosted the BET show 106 & Park.  Tran's TV One movie, The Fright Nite Files, was also screened that year.

Film and television roles: 2015–present 
In 2015, Tran was featured in the Spring/Summer lookbook for French-based athletic brand Le Coq Sportif. She also appeared on the covers of several magazines, including Rolling Out, Flaunt Magazine, Ouch Magazine, The Hundreds, Cliche Magazine, Bleu Magazine and Annex Magazine, including two feature stories on ELLE.com.  Her work led her to a contract with Wilhelmina Models LA in 2015.

Tran's first featured film, 3-Headed Shark Attack, was released that summer, followed by the lead in the short film PrXde. She later gained recognition for her performance as Vanessa Ivy in the fashion web series by StyleHaul titled Vanity, sponsored by the makeup brand Maybelline.

After supporting roles in A Weekend with the Family and The Nice Guys, Tran landed the lead in Only for One Night, portraying Chloe, a married woman whose perfect life deals with betrayal when her sister drugs her husband and sleeps with him. All three movies were released in 2016.  That same year, she partnered up with ColourPop Cosmetics to release the limited edition cosmetic collaboration, KaePop.

After her departure from The Bay, Tran began co-starring in TNT's Claws (2017), a TV series about five diverse manicurists working at the Nail Artisan of Manatee County salon in South Florida. Tran was selected for her ability to bring "a layer [...] that wasn’t one note" to the character, according to showrunner Janine Sherman Barrois.

In October 2019, it was announced that Tran had joined the cast of FOX's Deputy in a recurring role as Genevieve. In 2020, she returned to The Bay for its sixth season. In 2021, Tran won the Daytime Emmy for Outstanding Performance by a Lead Actress in a Daytime Fiction Program, making her the first person of Asian Pacific American descent to win an Emmy.

In 2022, she became the host of Upcycle Nation, a Fuse TV competition show focused on sustainable fashion.

Personal life

Relationships 
Tran began dating R&B singer Chris Brown in November 2010. The couple briefly broke up when Brown reconciled with his ex-girlfriend, singer Rihanna. After the latter's relationship ended, Tran and Brown continued their relationship, but split after it was revealed in March 2015 that Brown had a daughter, Royalty Brown, with Nia Guzman.  In February 2017, Tran was granted a temporary 100-yard restraining order against Brown after she accused him of harassing her on social media. After testifying under oath, she was granted a 5-year restraining order against Brown in June 2017.

Tran dated former football player Victor Cruz from late 2017 to early 2021.

Beliefs 
Tran is a Christian and has stated: "This is about recognizing my mistakes and learning from them. I own up to all the poor choices I have made and pray for the better. I pray everyday to God to strengthen me as a human and a young lady."

Filmography

Film

Television

Awards

References

External links 

 
 
 Karrueche Tran on Twitter

Living people
1988 births
American socialites
American Christians
21st-century American actresses
American people of Vietnamese descent
American models of Vietnamese descent
American female models
Female models from California
Birmingham High School alumni
Actresses of Vietnamese descent
American actors of Jamaican descent
Daytime Emmy Award winners